"Zanna" is a song originally written and performed by Belgian musician Luc van Acker and American singer Anna Domino in 1984. A successful cover was performed by Belgian musician and songwriter Selah Sue, Tom Barman and The Subs. This version was released on 25 November 2011 as a digital download in Belgium. It is the theme song for the charity event "Music for Life 2011". In 2012 the song made a comeback due to the success it had with "Music for Life". Van Acker performed at the Suikerrock festival with a 14-year-old girl who was named after the song "Zanna". Van Acker has previously met the family in 1998 after having made a remix using the sound of her heartbeat in vitro. However, in 2012, music brought the two back together after having found Zanna Ramaekers’s a cappella cover of "Zanna" on YouTube. They performed on the stage at Suikerrock and on the Belgian national TV show “Villa Vanthilt”.

Music video
A music video to accompany the release of "Zanna" was first released onto YouTube on 28 November 2011 at a total length of three minutes and fifty-seven seconds.

Track listing

Credits and personnel
Lead vocals – Selah Sue
Producers – Jeroen De Pessemier
Lyrics – Anna Domino, Luc Van Acker
Label: Because Music

Chart performance

Release history

References

2011 singles
Selah Sue songs
Ultratop 50 Singles (Flanders) number-one singles
1984 songs
Because Music singles